The Afyon Grand Mosque is a historical mosque in Afyonkarahisar in Afyonkarahisar province, Turkey.

The mosque
The mosque is the most important one of the many mosques in town. It was built in 1272 by Hasan Nusretüddin. Its architect was Emir Hac Bey. It is an example of the Anatolian wooden mosque architecture from the Seljuk period. A wooden beam roof covering nine naves is supported by 40 wooden columns with well-executed capitals in stalactite decoration. The middle nave is slightly wider than the others, as well as slightly higher. Around the marble prayer niche some verses from the koran are written. The construction date is indicated there also. In 1341 a first restoration was executed by Muinuddin Emir Abdullah Bey, an inscription indicating this can be found on the east front door. The building was preserved in its original shape with a flat roof, however another roof was added during a more recent restoration. The minaret is in brick with lozenge glazed shapes for decoration, a rare survivor from Seljuk times.

Gallery

References

Further reading 
 Turkey, Agon cultuur reisgidsen in kleur (Dutch translation of Knaurs Kulturführer in Farbe Türkei) and notice on site.

Seljuk mosques in Turkey
Mosques completed in 1272
Buildings and structures in Afyonkarahisar
13th-century mosques
World Heritage Tentative List for Turkey